Lutheran Medical Center is a hospital in Wheat Ridge, Colorado.

History
On May 6, 1903, members of St. John's Lutheran Church in Denver met to begin planning a TB sanitarium for the region. In 1905, the Evangelical Lutheran Sanitarium, a tent colony for tuberculosis patients, opened in Wheat Ridge, a few miles west of Denver's city limits. As the demand for tuberculosis treatment waned, the facility moved toward serving Jefferson County as a general medical facility. Lutheran Hospital opened in 1961 and grew along with the county, expanding significantly in 1964 and 1968. The 1970s brought a name change to Lutheran Medical Center, a six floor tower addition in 1973, and expansion of the Critical Care Unit in 1985.

In 1997, Lutheran Medical Center, Saint Joseph Hospital and the Primera Healthcare physician group integrated to form Exempla Healthcare.

In 2010, a new 12 room operating suite, an 18-bed recovery room and a 24-bed pre-surgery area opened in the five-story North Pavilion addition, as part of a five-year building project that added 295,000 square feet to the campus.

References

External links
Lutheran Medical Center official website
Lutheran Medical Center Foundation

Wheat Ridge, Colorado
Buildings and structures in Jefferson County, Colorado
Hospitals in Colorado
Hospital buildings completed in 1961
Intermountain Health